Casu proviso was a writ of entry, given by the Statute of Gloucester, in cases where a tenant in dowry transfers property to another in fee, or for term of life, or in tail. The writ lies for him in reversion against the transfer.

References

Writs
Medieval English law
1278 in England
1278
1270s in law
English legal terminology
Legal documents with Latin names